Time is Running Out is the second and final album by American jazz/R&B group Brass Fever recorded in 1976 and released on the Impulse! label.

Reception
The AllMusic review states "Time Is Running Out is uneven but does have its moments".

Track listing
 "Time Is Running Out" (McKinley Jackson, Sharon Jones) - 5:52 
 "Takin' It to the Streets" (Michael McDonald) - 4:20 
 "Boogie on Reggae Woman" (Stevie Wonder) - 4:47 
 "Mr. Tambourine Man" (Bob Dylan) - 5:25 
 "Dancing Machine" (Hal Davis, Don Fletcher, Dean Parks) - 6:00 
 "Pressure Drop" (Toots Hibbert) - 4:02 
 "Summertime" (George Gershwin, Ira Gershwin, DuBose Heyward) - 6:35 
 "Funky Carnival" (Esmond Edwards) - 3:37

Personnel
Al Aarons, Oscar Brashear, Bobby Bryant, Snooky Young - trumpet  
George Bohanon, Garnett Brown, Jimmy Cleveland, Maurice Spears - trombone 
Pee Wee Ellis, Sahib Shihab, Ernie Watts - alto saxophone, flute
Ray Parker Jr., Lee Ritenour - electric guitar
John Barnes Jr., Jerry Peters - keyboards
Henry Davis, Scott Edwards - electric bass
James Gadson - drums
Eddie "Bongo" Brown - congas
Bill Summers - percussion
Reggie Dozier, Esmond Edwards, Julia Tillman, Luther Waters, Maxine Waters, Oren Waters, Shirley Jones, Brenda Jones, Valorie Jones - vocals
McKinley Jackson - conductor, arranger
The Sid Sharp Strings (track 1)

References

Impulse! Records albums
Brass Fever albums
1976 albums
Albums produced by Esmond Edwards